The following article is a list of lighthouses in Cape Verde. Cape Verde has tens of lighthouses scattered across its nine major islands. The lighthouses are administered by the Direction of Marine and Ports (Direcção Geral de Marinha e Portos) or DGMP.

Boa Vista

Brava

Fogo

Maio

Sal

Santiago

Santo Antão

São Nicolau

São Vicente

See also
 Lists of lighthouses and lightvessels

References

External links

Lighthouses

Lighthouses
Cape Verde